John Porch (born 4 March 1994) is an Australian professional rugby union player, currently playing for Irish side Connacht.

Porch joined Irish province Connacht, who compete in the United Rugby Championship and European Rugby Champions Cup, ahead of the 2019–20 northern hemisphere season. Connacht's current head coach is former Australia 7s head coach Andy Friend.

Australia
Porch represented Australia at the 2016 Rio Olympics.
He represented Australia at the Gold Coast 2018 Commonwealth Games for the Australian Sevens.

References

External links
 
 
 
 
 

1994 births
Living people
Australian rugby union players
Male rugby sevens players
Australia international rugby sevens players
Indigenous Australian rugby union players
Indigenous Australian Olympians
Rugby sevens players at the 2016 Summer Olympics
Olympic rugby sevens players of Australia
Connacht Rugby players
Australian expatriate rugby union players
Australian expatriate sportspeople in Ireland
Expatriate rugby union players in Ireland
Rugby union wings
Sydney (NRC team) players